Dudley Charles Cary-Elwes (5 February 1868 – 1 May 1932) was Roman Catholic prelate who served as the Bishop of Northampton from 1921 to 1932.

Born in Nice, France on 5 February 1868 to Valentine Dudley Henry Cary Elwes & his second wife Alice Geraldine née  Ward he was ordained to the priesthood on 30 May 1896 in Rome. He was appointed the Bishop of the Diocese of Northampton by the Holy See on 21 November 1921. His consecration to the Episcopate took place on 15 December 1921, the principal consecrator was Cardinal Francis Bourne, Archbishop of Westminster, and the principal co-consecrators were Bishop Arthur Doubleday of Brentwood and Bishop Thomas Dunn of Nottingham .

He died in office on 1 May 1932, aged 64, and was buried at Great Billing, Northamptonshire.

References

1868 births
1932 deaths
20th-century Roman Catholic bishops in England
Roman Catholic bishops of Northampton